Elliott Hodgson is an English former professional rugby league footballer who played for Huddersfield Giants in the Super League. He was a fullback by preference, He made his debut against  St. Helens in a 12–10 loss, where he was Sky Sports man-of-the-match in this game. The 2009 Super League XIV was his début season with the Huddersfield first-team, and he was number 34 for this season. He was awarded the number 31 jersey for 2010's Super League XV. By 2019, he had made the switch from Rugby League to Rugby Union and was playing for Huddersfield RUFCR.U.F.C.

References

External links
Sale Rugby profile

1991 births
Living people
Huddersfield Giants players
Rugby league fullbacks